Jack Roberts (February 18, 1910 – February 27, 1988) was a United States district judge of the United States District Court for the Western District of Texas.

Education and career

Born in Sweetwater, Texas, Roberts received a Bachelor of Laws from the University of Texas School of Law in 1933. He was a United States Army Staff Sergeant in the Intelligence Corps during World War II, from 1942 to 1946. He was district attorney of Austin, Texas from 1946 to 1948. He was a judge of the 126th District Court from 1948 to 1966.

Federal judicial service

Roberts was nominated by President Lyndon B. Johnson on June 28, 1966, to a seat on the United States District Court for the Western District of Texas vacated by Judge Homer Thornberry. He was confirmed by the United States Senate on July 22, 1966, and received his commission the same day. He served as Chief Judge from 1979 to 1980. He assumed senior status on May 1, 1980. Roberts served in that capacity until his death on February 27, 1988, in Austin.

References

Sources
 

1910 births
1988 deaths
Judges of the United States District Court for the Western District of Texas
United States district court judges appointed by Lyndon B. Johnson
20th-century American judges
United States Army soldiers
20th-century American lawyers
People from Sweetwater, Texas